The 1984 Rothmans Spa 1000 kilometers was the seventh round of the 1984 World Endurance Championship.  It took place at the Circuit de Spa-Francorchamps, Belgium on 2 September 1984.

Official results
Class winners in bold.  Cars failing to complete 75% of the winner's distance marked as Not Classified (NC).

6 Hours of Spa-Francorchamps
Spa
1000km